Karhal  Assembly constituency is one  of the 403 constituencies of the Uttar Pradesh Legislative Assembly,  India. It is a part of the Mainpuri district and  one of the five assembly constituencies in the Mainpuri Lok Sabha constituency. First election in this assembly constituency was held in 1957 after the "DPACO (1956)" (delimitation order) was passed in 1956. After the "Delimitation of Parliamentary and Assembly Constituencies Order" was passed in 2008, the constituency was assigned identification number 110.

Currently this constituency is represented by Samajwadi Party's national president Akhilesh Yadav who has been elected in 2022 Uttar Pradesh Legislative Assembly election by defeating Bharatiya Janata Party's candidate S.P Singh Baghel.

Yadav is currently serving as the leader of opposition in 18th Uttar Pradesh Assembly and had previously also hold the office of Chief Minister of the state from 2012 to 2017.

Members of the Legislative Assembly

Election Results

2022

2017

2012

Wards  / Areas
Extent  of Karhal Assembly constituency is KC Barnahal, Karhal & Karhal NP of  Karhal Tehsil; KCs Ghiror, Kuchela & Ghiror NP of Mainpuri Tehsil.

See also

Mainpuri Lok Sabha constituency
Mainpuri district
18th Legislative Assembly of Uttar Pradesh
Uttar Pradesh Legislative Assembly
Vidhan Bhawan

References

External links
 

Mainpuri district
Assembly constituencies of Uttar Pradesh
Constituencies established in 1956